Upper Canada Village is a heritage park near Morrisburg, Ontario, which depicts a 19th-century village in Upper Canada.

History
Construction of Upper Canada Village began in 1958 as part of the St. Lawrence Seaway project, which required the permanent flooding of ten communities in the area, known as The Lost Villages. Upper Canada Village was a part of the project's heritage preservation plan. Many of the buildings in Upper Canada Village were transported directly from the villages to be flooded.

The park, owned and operated by the St. Lawrence Parks Commission, was opened to the public in 1961.

Other buildings from the Lost Villages were moved to Ault Park, where they comprise a living museum run by the Lost Villages Historical Society.
 
The park also incorporates a memorial to the Battle of Crysler's Farm, a War of 1812 battle which also took place on land submerged by the Seaway project.

Collection

Upper Canada Village endeavours to depict life in a rural English Canadian setting during the year 1866. Featured at the site are over 40 historical buildings, including several working mills (woollen mill, grist-mill and sawmill) and trades buildings (blacksmith, tinsmith, cabinetmaker, cooper, bakery, cheese-maker).  Farming is demonstrated through the growing, harvesting or processing of heritage vegetables and livestock.  Aspects of late 19th-century domestic arts, social life, music, religion, and politics are also discussed, interpreted and demonstrated at by staff dressed in clothing of the period. Local gardens in the village feature the flora and fauna commonly grown in the summer

In film
The 1973 version of The Adventures of Tom Sawyer, starring Josh Albee, Buddy Ebsen, Jane Wyatt and Vic Morrow was shot entirely on the grounds of Upper Canada Village.

Affiliations
The Museum is affiliated with: CMA,  CHIN, and Virtual Museum of Canada.

References

External links

 Upper Canada Village
 Promotional video for Upper Canada Village, 1972, Archives of Ontario YouTube Channel

Folk museums in Canada
Museums in the United Counties of Stormont, Dundas and Glengarry
Living museums in Canada
Open-air museums in Canada
History museums in Ontario
The Lost Villages
Relocated buildings and structures in Canada
Blacksmith shops
St. Lawrence Parks Commission